Zu Geng is the name of:

Zu Geng of Shang (died 1184 BC), Shang dynasty king
Zu Gengzhi ( 450–520), Liang dynasty mathematician